Pingyao County is a county in Jinzhong in central Shanxi Province, China. It is home to Pingyao Ancient City, a AAAAA-rated tourist attraction, preserving a great deal of architecture from the Ming & Qing dynasties.

History 
Pingyao County is home to Pingyao Ancient City, which has history dating back to approximately 800 BCE.

The area has been incorporated since the Western Han dynasty, when it formed Zhongdu County.

On November 18, 2019, a coal mine operated by Fengyan Group suffered a gas explosion, killing 15 miners and injuring 9 others.

Geography 
The Fen River runs through Pingyao County.

Pingyao County is border by Qi County to its east, Wenshui County to its north, Fenyang to its west, Jiexiu to its southwest, Qinyuan County to its south, and both Qin County and Wuxiang County to its southeast.

Climate

Administrative divisions
Pingyao County administers three subdistricts, five towns and nine townships.

Economy 

As of 2018, the Pingyao County's GDP totaled ¥11.869 billion, a 7.5% increase from the previous year. The county's consumer retail sales totaled ¥6.801 billion, an 8.4% increase from the previous year, and its public budget revenue totaled ¥665 million, an increase of 35.7% from the previous year.

10.2% of Pingyao County's output came from its primary sector, 33.0% came from its secondary sector, and 56.8% came from its tertiary sector.

Agriculture 
In 2018, the county produced 260,000 tons of grain, 570,000 tons of vegetables, and 190,000 tons of meat, eggs, and milk. The county grew 30,000 mu of corn, 15,000 mu of Chinese medicine ingredients, and sizable amounts of other grains, fruits, and vegetables.

Industry 
Major industrial entities with operations in Pingyao County include the China Iron & Steel Research Institute Group, Huawei, Pingyao Beer, Higrand Biotech, Hesteel Group, Shanxi Liangyu Carbon, and Fengyan Group.

Tourism 
In 2018, Pingyao County received 15,486,700 tourists. The same year, the China Cultural Fair included it in its list of "China's Most Beautiful Counties".

Transportation 
The Datong–Puzhou railway and the Datong–Xi'an high-speed railway both run through the county.

National Highway 108 and the Datong-Yuncheng Expressway also run through the county.

See also
 List of counties in Shanxi
Pingyao Ancient City

References

Pingyao County
Jinzhong